Mohamed Imran (born 25 May 1988) commonly known as Kuda Imma, is a Maldivian footballer who plays as a goalkeeper, currently for Sh. Milandhoo on loan from Victory.

International career
Imran announced his retirement from international football on 12 October 2017.

References

External links
 
 

1988 births
Living people
Maldivian footballers
Maldives international footballers
Victory Sports Club players
Club Valencia players
Association football goalkeepers
T.C. Sports Club players